is a Japanese online magazine for manga created by Shueisha, spin-off from its Jump line of magazines. Launched on September 22, 2014, the magazine operates as a free mobile app and website. The magazine serializes original titles and titles from other Shueisha manga magazines, and also carries digital editions of Weekly Shōnen Jump. Notable titles serialized in Shōnen Jump+ include Fire Punch, World's End Harem, Astra Lost in Space, Hell's Paradise: Jigokuraku, Spy × Family, Kaiju No. 8 and Dandadan.

Outside of Japan, Shueisha releases the original manga from the platform on Manga Plus. Starting in 2023, every new manga series launched on Shōnen Jump+ will receive a simultaneous English release on Manga Plus.

History

Pre-launch 
Shueisha's Weekly Shōnen Jump reached a peak weekly circulation of 6.53 million copies in the 1990s, though its readership has since steadily declined as a result of the broader decline of the print media industry. In response, Shueisha turned towards digital distribution in an attempt to reach out to a wider audience.

A free digital edition of Weekly Shōnen Jump was issued as a result of the 2011 Tōhoku earthquake and tsunami, after shipping and distribution lines were affected by the disaster. Issuing the digital magazine was difficult at that time because of different work flows from issuing printed version. In 2012, Shueisha launched the online bookstore app Jump Book Store, which enjoyed mild commercial success and became an inspiration for Shōnen Jump+. 

In 2013, Shueisha launched the online manga platform Jump LIVE. Although the app was downloaded over 1 million times in three weeks, the editorial department found it contained too much content and it was difficult to distinguish between free and paid content. Shueisha would ultimately discontinue the platform. Nevertheless, the experience of launching an online platform helped the company for the coming Shōnen Jump+.

Post-launch 
Shōnen Jump+ was launched on September 22, 2014, with more than 30 manga series, some of which were transferred from Jump LIVE, including ēlDLIVE and Nekoda-biyori. The digital version of Weekly Shōnen Jump can be purchased in Shōnen Jump+ at 300 yen per issue or 900 yen per month. Despite its title, Shōnen Jump+ also features series targeted towards female readers in addition to its namesake shōnen manga, which is targeted towards young males.

Compared to Weekly Shōnen Jump, titles published in Shōnen Jump+ are subject to laxer editorial restrictions around explicit content. According to Shuhei Hosono, the chief editor of Shōnen Jump+, the number of weekly active users increased from 1.1 million to 1.3 million between April and May 2016; Hosono noted that the increase was catalyzed by the release of Fire Punch and World's End Harem, which both contain depictions of sex and violence not permitted in Weekly Shōnen Jump. Starting from 2017, Weekly Shōnen Jump began serializing works made by manga artists who previously published their series on Shōnen Jump+, such as Taishi Tsutsui's We Never Learn, Tatsuki Fujimoto's Chainsaw Man, and Tsurun Hatomune's Mitama Security: Spirit Busters. 

2019 was a year of breakthrough for the platform. Spy × Family, which was a new series in 2019, attracted many users to the app, especially female users. After it began serialization, the proportion of female users increased by 5% while 60%-65% were male. Astra Lost in Space received an anime adaptation and Eren the Southpaw received a TV drama adaptation in 2019; both are original titles of Shōnen Jump+. Moreover, its original titles started to win big awards. Astra Lost in Space won the 12th Manga Taishō Award, becoming the first web comic to do so.

Manga Plus, a global version of Shōnen Jump+, was launched on January 28, 2019. An international edition of Shōnen Jump+ was first proposed in 2017 as a means to appeal to non-Japanese audiences; the app is offered in English and Spanish. Also in 2019, Shueisha produced Marvel × Shōnen Jump+ Super Collaboration, a collaboration series with Marvel Comics composed of seven one-shots written by various Weekly Shōnen Jump artists including Yu-Gi-Oh!s Kazuki Takahashi. In December 2020, Deadpool: Samurai started serialization on the same platform after the one-shot in October 2019.

In 2020, due to the COVID-19 pandemic, some titles in Shōnen Jump+ have been published on a modified schedule. A website namely "Jump Digital Labo" (ジャンプ・デジタルラボ) was launched by the editorial department of Shōnen Jump+ in July 2020, for recruiting proposals of digital development. Kaiju No. 8, which has been serialized since July 2020, has gained 30 million page views in October 2020, becoming the fastest Shōnen Jump+ manga to do so.

On December 14, 2020, it was announced that the second part of Chainsaw Man, the first part of which had previously been serialized on Weekly Shōnen Jump, will be serialized on Shōnen Jump+.

Metrics
By May 2019, over 60 titles were serialized on Shōnen Jump+. The app had been downloaded 10 million times; combined, the app and website had 2.5 million weekly active users. Shōnen Jump+ accumulated over 12 billion yen in sales revenue. As of February 2022, the app had been downloaded 19 million times, with the app and website having approximately 4.6 million weekly active users. Shueisha estimated Shōnen Jump+s users to be 65% male, and that 18 to 24 year olds were its largest age demographic at 32%.

Hell's Paradise: Jigokuraku was the most popular series on the platform in 2018, while Spy × Family has been the most popular Shōnen Jump+ title since 2019. Spy × Family is noted for attracting readers, especially female, to the app, according to Hosono, the trend of its sales are comparable to Assassination Classroom, a high-profile title published in Weekly Shōnen Jump.

Censorship
Due to explicit content, World's End Harem and Saotome Shimai wa Manga no Tame nara!? cannot be accessed via its iOS app, but is available on its website and Android app.

Current series

{| class="wikitable sortable" style="background: #FFF;"
|-
!Series title
!Author(s)
!Premiered
!Release day
!Notes
|-
|
|Kuraku
|
|Daily (Mon-Fri)
|Transferred from Jump Live
|-
|
|Hidekaz Himaruya
|
|Thursdays
|Transferred from Monthly Birz
|-
|
|Asato Mizu
|
|Every other Sunday
|
|-
|
|Takeshi Sakurai
|
|Once a month
|
|-
|
|Masami Kurumada
|
|Saturdays
|Transferred from Weekly Playboy
|-
|
|Torajirō Kishi
|
|Every other Wednesday
|Transferred from Grand Jump Web
|-
|
|LINK, SAVAN
|
|Every other Sunday
|Transferred from Ultra Jump
|-
|
|Eko Mikawa
|
|Every other Thursday
|
|-
|
|Daiki Ihara
|
|On hiatus
|
|-
|
|Kouji Ooishi
|
|Every other Monday
|Transferred from Weekly Shōnen Jump
|-
|
|Yusura Kankitsu, Hinata Yaya
|
|Every other Sunday
|In parallel with Dash X Comic, novel adaptation
|-
|
|Takahiro, Yōhei Takemura
|
|Every other Saturday
|
|-
|Spy × Family
|Tatsuya Endo
|
|Every other Sunday
|
|-
|
|Robinson Haruhara, Hirakei
|
|Tuesdays
|
|-
|Heart Gear
|Tsuyoshi Takaki
|
|On hiatus
|
|-
|
|Kyouhei Miyajima
|
|Every other Monday
|
|-
|
|Yu Hashimoto
|
|Saturdays
|
|-
|{{nihongo|Hokkaido Gals Are Super Adorable!'|道産子ギャルはなまらめんこい|Dosanko Gyaru ha Namaramenkoi}}
|Kai Ikada
|
|Every other Wednesday
|
|-
|
|Yasuhiro Kanō
|
|On hiatus
|
|-
|
|Rikito Nakamura, Yukiko Nozawa
|
|Thursdays
|In parallel with Weekly Young Jump|-
|
|Aka Akasaka, Mengo Yokoyari
|
|Thursdays
|In parallel with Weekly Young Jump|-
|
|Naoya Matsumoto
|
|Every other Friday
|
|-
|
|Akissa Saiké
|
|On hiatus
|
|-
|
|Akira Amano
|
|Sundays
|
|-
|
|Akari Kajimoto
|
|Every other Tuesday
|
|-
|
|Nao Sasaki
|
|Every other Wednesday
|
|-
|
|Masahiro Hirakata
|
|Mondays
|
|-
|
|Yukinobu Tatsu
|
|Tuesdays
|
|-
|
|LINK, Kotaro Shono
|
|Every other Sunday
|Second part of World's End Harem|-
|
|Mitsuru Kido
|
|Tuesdays
|In parallel with Jump SQ|-
|
|Sanami Suzuki
|
|Every other Saturday
|
|-
|
|Kounosuke
|
|Every other Monday
|Indies series
|-
|
|Sekka Iwata, Yu Aoki
|
|Wednesdays
|
|-
|
|Nakamura Hinata
|
|Every other Sunday
|
|-
|
|Kū Tanaka
|
|Every other Tuesday
|Indies series
|-
|
|Souichirou
|
|Every other Saturday
|
|-
|
|Aruma Arima, Masuku Fukayama
|
|Every other Wednesday
|
|-
|
|Tomoya Harikawa
|
|On hiatus
|
|-
|
|Suzuo
|
|On hiatus
|Indies series
|-
|
|Angyaman
|
|Mondays
|
|-
|
|Riku Sanjo, Yusaku Shibata
|
|Saturdays
|In parallel with V-Jump|-
|
|Yatoyato
|
|Tuesdays
|
|-
|
|Ikkou Tanaka
|
|Wednesdays
|In parallel with Weekly Young Jump|-
|
|Sohei Koji, Eiichiro Oda
|
|Every other Friday
|In parallel with Saikyō Jump|-
|
|Jomyakun, Mizuki Yoda
|
|Wednesdays
|
|-
|
|Kentaro Yabuki
|
|Mondays
|Transferred from Weekly Shōnen Jump|-
|
|Kocha Agasawa
|
|Every other Monday
|
|-
|
|Homura Kawamoto, Toyotaka Haneda
|
|Fridays
|
|-
|
|Kenji Sakaki
|
|Mondays
|
|-
|
|Asako Mabuchi, Kohei Ando
|
|Every other Monday
|
|-
|
|Hidari Yokoyama
|
|Thursdays
|
|-
|
|Tatsuki Fujimoto
|
|Wednesdays
|
|-
|
|Wakaeru Haruni
|
|Fridays
|
|-
|
|Yoshihiro Haida
|
|On hiatus
|Indies series
|-
|
|Sawaru Mega
|
|Thursdays
|
|-
|
|Tokaku Kondo
|
|Fridays
|
|-
|
|Getabako
|
|Fridays
|
|-
|
|Hechii
|
|Tuesdays
|
|-
|
|Kamiyoshi, Nabetsuyo
|
|Sundays
|Indies series
|-
|
|Yuu Chiba
|
|Thursdays
|
|-
|
|Kakunoshin Futsuzawa
|
|Every other Thursday
|
|-
|
|Watari Mitogawa
|
|Sundays
|
|-
|
|Morudau
|
|Tuesdays
|Indies series
|-
|
|Nariaki Narita
|
|Saturdays
|
|-
|
|Teppei Fukushima
|
|Tuesdays
|
|-
|
|Masashi Kishimoto, Shingo Kimura
|
|Sundays
|
|-
|
|Masashi Kishimoto, Natsuo Sai
|
|Saturdays
|
|-
|
|COVER Corporation, Anmitsu Okada
|
|Tuesdays
|
|-
|
|Man☆Gatarou
|
|Once a month
|
|-
|
|Kazuki Hiraoka
|
|Mondays
|
|-
|
|Nioshi Noai
|
|Fridays
|Indies series
|-
|
|Wataru Momose
|
|Saturdays
|
|-
|
|Kei Tsuchiya
|
|Wednesdays
|Indies series
|-
|
|Tomoya Watabiki, Garaku Akinai
|
|Fridays
|
|-
|
|Natsume Yamamoto
|
|Mondays
|Short term series
|-
|
|Mitsu Ibuka, Natsudou Munakata
|
|Saturdays
|Third part of Dorei Yūgi
|-
|
|Norihiko Kurazono
|
|Mondays
|
|-
|
|Ryouma Kitada
|
|Sundays
|
|-
|
|Ryu Genkei
|
|Wednesdays
|Indies series
|-
|
|Tsukasa Sei
|
|Mondays
|Indies series
|-
||Kozuki Osamu
|
|Fridays
|
|-
|Beat & Motion|Naoki Fujita
|
|Every other Saturday
|
|-
||Mitsuchiyomaru, Yuki Sato
|
|Tuesdays
|
|-
|Fire Emblem Engage|Kazurō Kyō
|
|Once a month
|In parallel with Saikyō Jump|-
|The Subject Shia|Kōki Jinnōchi
|
|
|Short term series
|-
|Sekkyaku Musō|Tsurun Hatonume
|
|
|
|-
|}

Finished series5-byou DouwaAbyss RageAccel StarActive Raid - Kidou Kyoushuushitsu Daihachigakari (manga adaptation)Aejuma-sama no GakkouAkuma no Memumemu-chanAna no MujinaAno Musume wa YarimanAnten-sama no HaranouchiArata Primal: The New PrimitiveAstra Lost in SpaceAurora NodeBara to ButaThe Birds of DeathBlack Clover Gaiden: Quartet KnightsBlue FlagBokutachi Hoikuka Koukou 1-nenseiBorderless NameBoys Over Flowers Season 2Bubble (manga adaptation)Bye Bye JinruiCamelia CurtainCheer Danshi!! Go BreakersChronos RulerChikyuu Ningen Terra-chanComics: MancoloCurtain's up, I'm offDaisaiyuuki Bokuhi SeidenDare ga Kenja wo Koroshita ka?Darling in the Franxx (manga adaptation)Deadpool: SamuraiDear Sa-chanDestroy EverythingDon't Blush, Sekime-san!Dorei YuugiDorei Yuugi GurenDragon Ball: That Time I Got Reincarnated as Yamcha!Dricam!!East, Into The NightēlDLIVEEmperor to IsshoEren the SouthpawExcuse Me Dentist, It's Touching Me!EXP:0Fire PunchFuji no Yamai wa Fushi no YamaiFull Charge!! Kaden-chan Shokugeki no Sōma - L'étoileGaming OjōsamaGunjou ni SirenHachuurui-chan wa NatsukanaiHana Nochi Hare - Hanadan Next SeasonHara Hara SenseiHell's Paradise: JigokurakuHello World (manga adaptation)Jigokuraku ~Saikyō no Nukenin Gaman no Gabimaru~Henshuu-sha ☆ Momii no Dai BoukenHimitsu no KajitsuHina ChangeHigh-Risk Mission TherapyHonnori! Don PatchHow to Make Delicious CoffeeHyperinflationI Sold My Life for Ten Thousand Yen Per Year (manga adaptation)Iroha ni Hotoke!iShoujo+Itomo tayasuku Okonawareru Juusan-sai ga Ikiru Tame no OshigotoJingi Naki Yoshida-ke Juni Taisen: Zodiac War (manga adaptation)Kami no ManimaniKami-sama, Ki-sama o Koroshitai.Karada SagashiKarada Sagashi DifferentKarada Sagashi KaiKeppare Matsubara-san!Killer FriendsKiller HeavenKiss x DeathKimetsu no Aima!Kimi ga Shinu Made Ato Hyaku NichiKoLD8: King of the Living DeadKuroko no Basket: Replace PlusLand LockLeviathanLet's! Haikyu!?Magical Pâtissière Kosaki-chan!!Majo no KaigashuuMakui no ReaseManken ni BishoujoThe Maou-samaMarvel × Shōnen Jump+ Super CollaborationMofumofuMonban Kaeru wa ShagamitaiMoon LandMone-san no Majimesugiru TsukiaikataMuhyo & Roji's Bureau of Supernatural Investigation: Magical Genus Magic Tool Master ChapterMutou to SatouMy AnimalMy Hero Academia Smash!!My Hero Academia: VigilantesNano HazardNavirinthNewton no TsubomiOhisama BirdieOnsengai no MedusaOresuki (manga adaptation)Oyakusoku no NeverlandPochi KuroPsycho-Pass 3 (manga adaptation)Psycho Pass 3: The First Inspector (manga adaptation)Red ListRengoku no ToshiThe Right Way to Make Jump!Romantic KillerRough Diamond - Manga Gakkou e YoukosoRoute EndRWBY: The Official MangaSaguri-chan TankentaiSatsuriku no ŌuSeiyū Mashimashi ClubSenpai! Ore no Koe de Iyasa Renaide Kudasai!The Serious Succubus Hiragi-sanShōwa Otome Otogi BanashiShuukyoku EngageShinotoriThe Sign of AbyssSlime LifeSoloist in a CageSōsei no Onmyōji: Tenen Jakko: Nishoku KokkeigaSpotless Love: This Love Cannot Be Any More BeautifulSSSS.Gridman (manga adaptation)Suito-toSummer Time RenderingSushi Sister HunterTakopi's Original SinTajū Jinkaku KanojoTenjinToge TogeTokedase! Mizore-chanTomogui KyoushitsuTomohiro Hasegawa's Struggle With Digital Drawing -Episode Unreal Engine-Tonari no Heya Kara Aegigoe ga Surunde Sukedo...Tonkatsu DJ AgetarōTouhou Momotarou, Zen Part BoshuuToumei Ningen no HoneTsugihagi QuestThe Magnificent Kotobuki (manga adaptation)The Vertical WorldUchū no TamagoUltramarine Magmell (manga adaptation)Vocchi-menWa no KageWareware wa Uchuujin na no da!!World's End Harem: Britannia LumiéreWorld's End Harem: Fantasia Academy (transferred from Ultra Jump)World 4u_Yagiza no YuujinYukari-chanYoukoso Bourei Sougiya-sanYukari-chanYukimi DaifukuYumizuka Iroha wa Tejun ga Daiji! See also 
 Shonen Jump digital vault''

References

External links 
 Official website 
  

Shueisha magazines
Anime and manga websites
Internet properties established in 2014